The women's 4 × 400 metres relay event at the 1994 European Athletics Championships was held in Helsinki, Finland, at Helsinki Olympic Stadium on 13 and 14 August 1994.

Medalists

Results

Final
14 August

Heats
13 August

Heat 1

Heat 2

Participation
According to an unofficial count, 44 athletes from 10 countries participated in the event.

 (5)
 (4)
 (5)
 (5)
 (4)
 (4)
 (4)
 (5)
 (4)
 (5)

References

4 x 400 metres relay
4 x 400 metres relay at the European Athletics Championships
1994 in women's athletics